The LD postcode area, also known as the Llandrindod Wells postcode area, is a group of eight postcode districts in Wales. These postcode districts cover much of south Powys, including Llandrindod Wells, Brecon, Builth Wells, Presteigne, Knighton, Rhayader, Llanwrtyd Wells and Llangammarch Wells. The LD6 district also covers one isolated farmhouse in Ceredigion. The LD7 and LD8 districts extend across the border into England, covering very small parts of Shropshire and Herefordshire.

The LD area covers a sparsely populated area and contains fewer postcodes than any other area on the British mainland, except for the KW area in the north-east of Scotland.



Coverage
The approximate coverage of the postcode districts:

|-
! LD1
| LLANDRINDOD WELLS
| Llandrindod Wells, Crossgates, Newbridge-on-Wye
| Powys
|-
! LD2
| BUILTH WELLS
| Builth Wells, Llanafan Fawr, Erwood
| Powys
|-
! LD3
| BRECON
| Brecon, Talgarth
| Powys
|-
! LD4
| LLANGAMMARCH WELLS
| Llangammarch Wells, Garth, Cefn Gorwydd
| Powys
|-
! LD5
| LLANWRTYD WELLS
| Llanwrtyd Wells, Beulah, Abergwesyn
| Powys
|-
! LD6
| RHAYADER
| Rhayader, St Harmon, Pant-Y-Dwr
| Powys, Ceredigion
|-
! LD7
| KNIGHTON
| Knighton, Knucklas, Llangunllo, Llanfair Waterdine
| Powys, Shropshire
|-
! LD8
| PRESTEIGNE
| Presteigne, New Radnor, Norton, Stapleton
| Powys, Herefordshire
|}

Map

See also
Postcode Address File
List of postcode areas in the United Kingdom

References

External links
Royal Mail's Postcode Address File
A quick introduction to Royal Mail's Postcode Address File (PAF)
Using Welsh alternative addresses within Royal Mail's Postcode Address File (PAF)

Postcode areas covering Wales
Postcode areas covering the West Midlands (region)